Limnonectes asperatus is a species of frog in the family Dicroglossidae. It is endemic to Kalimantan, Borneo, in Indonesia.

This frog lives in rainforests. It is threatened by the loss of its habitat to logging operations.

References

asperatus
Amphibians of Indonesia
Endemic fauna of Borneo
Amphibians described in 1996
Taxonomy articles created by Polbot
Amphibians of Borneo